Sa'ar (lit. Storm) is a kibbutz in the western Galilee in Israel. Located near Nahariya, it falls under the jurisdiction of Mateh Asher Regional Council.

History
The kibbutz was founded in August 1948 by members of the Socialist-Zionist youth movement Hashomer Hatzair and Holocaust survivors reviving the land of the village mentioned in the Bible by its ancient name Achzib, evidence of human settlement at the site dates back to the 18th century BCE.

In August 2006, many of the kibbutz residents fled in the wake of Hezbollah rocket fire of up to 60 rockets a day. Kibbutz member David Lelchook was killed by shrapnel from a missile that hit the front yard of his home.

Economy
Bermad Innovative Water Management Solutions, jointly owned with Kibbutz Evron, manufactures automatically activated hydraulic valves used in water, fuel and fire extinguishing systems.

Notable people

 Jerry Seinfeld, worked as a volunteer at the age of 16 at this kibbutz

References

Kibbutzim
Kibbutz Movement
Mateh Asher Regional Council
Populated places established in 1948
Populated places in Northern District (Israel)
1948 establishments in Israel